Circobotys sinisalis is a moth in the family Crambidae. It was described by Francis Walker in 1859. It is found in the Democratic Republic of the Congo, Kenya and South Africa, where it has been recorded from the Eastern Cape.

References

Moths described in 1859
Pyraustinae